Jürg Röthlisberger (born 2 February 1955) is a Swiss judoka and  olympic champion. He won a gold medal in the middleweight division at the 1980 Summer Olympics in Moscow.

References

External links
 
 
 

1955 births
Living people
Swiss male judoka
Olympic judoka of Switzerland
Judoka at the 1976 Summer Olympics
Judoka at the 1980 Summer Olympics
Olympic gold medalists for Switzerland
Olympic medalists in judo
Medalists at the 1980 Summer Olympics
Medalists at the 1976 Summer Olympics
Olympic bronze medalists for Switzerland
20th-century Swiss people
21st-century Swiss people